Cody William Stashak (born June 4, 1994) is an American professional baseball pitcher who is a free agent. He has played in MLB for the Minnesota Twins.

Career

Amateur career
Stashak attended Oakcrest High School in Mays Landing, New Jersey.  He played college baseball for two seasons at Cumberland County College, before transferring to St. John's University. He was drafted by the Minnesota Twins in the 13th round of the 2015 Major League Baseball draft.

Professional career
Stashak played for the Elizabethton Twins, posting a 5-2 record with a  3.43 ERA in 44.2 innings. His 2016 season was split between the Cedar Rapids Kernels and the Fort Myers Miracle, posting a 10-5 record with a 2.80 ERA over 121.1 innings. He split the 2017 season between the Gulf Coast Twins, Fort Myers, and the Chattanooga Lookouts, combining to go 4-4 with a 3.60 ERA in 94.1 innings. His 2018 season was split between Fort Myers and Chattanooga, going a combined 2-1 with a 2.87 ERA in 59.2 innings. He split the 2019 minor league season between the Pensacola Blue Wahoos and the Rochester Red Wings, going a combined 7–3 with a 3.21 ERA over 53 innings. 

On July 22, 2019, the Twins selected Stashak's contract and promoted him to the major leagues. He made his debut on July 23, pitching two scoreless innings of relief versus the New York Yankees. Stashak went 0–1 with a 3.24 ERA over 24 innings for Twins in 2019.

In 2020 for the Twins, Stashak allowed 3 runs in 7 innings for a 3.86 ERA before landing on the injured list In his first two seasons in the majors, Stashak struck out 42 batters while allowing only four walks.

On June 25, 2021, Stashak was placed on the 60-day injured list with a left back disc injury. He made 15 total appearances for Minnesota in 2021, struggling to a 6.89 ERA with 26 strikeouts in 15.2 innings pitched.

Stashak pitched in 11 games for Minnesota in 2022, working to a 3-0 record and 3.86 ERA with 15 strikeouts in 16.1 innings of work. On June 8, 2022, it was announced that Stashak would undergo season-ending surgery to repair a torn labrum in his right shoulder.

References

External links

St. John's Red Storm bio

1994 births
Living people
Sportspeople from Atlantic County, New Jersey
Oakcrest High School alumni
People from Somers Point, New Jersey
Baseball players from New Jersey
Major League Baseball pitchers
Minnesota Twins players
St. John's Red Storm baseball players
Elizabethton Twins players
Fort Myers Miracle players
Cedar Rapids Kernels players
Gulf Coast Twins players
Chattanooga Lookouts players
Pensacola Blue Wahoos players
Rochester Red Wings players
Fort Myers Mighty Mussels players